Robert Martin Solovay (born December 15, 1938) is an American mathematician specializing in set theory.

Biography
Solovay earned his Ph.D. from the University of Chicago in 1964 under the direction of Saunders Mac Lane, with a dissertation on A Functorial Form of the Differentiable Riemann–Roch theorem. Solovay has spent his career at the University of California at Berkeley, where his Ph.D. students include W. Hugh Woodin and Matthew Foreman.

Work
Solovay's theorems include:
 Solovay's theorem showing that, if one assumes the existence of an inaccessible cardinal, then the statement "every set of real numbers is Lebesgue measurable" is consistent with Zermelo–Fraenkel set theory without the axiom of choice;
 Isolating the notion of 0#;
 Proving that the existence of a real-valued measurable cardinal is equiconsistent with the existence of a measurable cardinal;
 Proving that if  is a strong limit singular cardinal, greater than a strongly compact cardinal then  holds;
 With Stanley Tennenbaum, developing the method of iterated forcing and showing the consistency of Suslin's hypothesis;
 With Donald A. Martin, showed the consistency of Martin's axiom with arbitrarily large cardinality of the continuum;
 Outside of set theory, developing (with Volker Strassen) the Solovay–Strassen primality test, used to identify large natural numbers that are prime with high probability. This method has had implications for cryptography;
Regarding the P versus NP problem, he proved with T. P. Baker and J. Gill that relativizing arguments cannot prove .
 Proving that GL (the normal modal logic which has the instances of the schema  as additional axioms) completely axiomatizes the logic of the provability predicate of Peano arithmetic;
 With Alexei Kitaev, proving that a finite set of quantum gates can efficiently approximate an arbitrary unitary operator on one qubit in what is now known as Solovay–Kitaev theorem.

Selected publications

See also 
 Provability logic

References

External links 
 
 

American logicians
Members of the United States National Academy of Sciences
20th-century American mathematicians
Set theorists
1938 births
Living people